, or 'rough style', is a style of kabuki acting that uses exaggerated, dynamic  (forms or movements) and speech.  roles are characterised by the bold red or blue makeup worn by actors, as well as their enlarged and padded costumes. The term  is an abbreviation of the term , which literally means "wild-warrior style".

The  style was created and pioneered by Ichikawa Danjūrō I, a kabuki actor in the Edo period (1603-1867), and has come to be epitomized by his successors in the Ichikawa Danjūrō line of kabuki actors.

Notable Aragotoshi
 Bandō Mitsugorō VIII
 Bandō Mitsugorō X
 The Ichikawa Danjūrō line
 Ichikawa Danjūrō I
 Ichikawa Danjūrō II
 Ichikawa Danjūrō III
 Ichikawa Danjūrō IV
 Ichikawa Danjūrō V
 Ichikawa Danjūrō VI
 Ichikawa Danjūrō VII
 Ichikawa Danjūrō VIII
 Ichikawa Danjūrō IX
 Ichikawa Danjūrō X (Sanshō Ichikawa V)
 Ichikawa Danjūrō XI
 Ichikawa Danjūrō XII
 Ichikawa Danjūrō XIII
 Kataoka Ainosuke VI
 Matsumoto Hakuō II
 Matsumoto Kōshirō X
 Nakamura Shidō II

References

Kabuki
Japanese words and phrases